West Mayo was a parliamentary constituency in Ireland, which returned one Member of Parliament (MP) to the House of Commons of the Parliament of the United Kingdom, elected on a system of first-past-the-post, from 1885 to 1922.

Prior to the 1885 general election the area was part of the two-seat Mayo constituency. From 1922, on the establishment of the Irish Free State, it was not represented in the UK Parliament.

Boundaries
This constituency comprised the western part of County Mayo.

1885–1922: The baronies of Burrishoole and Murrisk, and that part of the barony of Carra not contained within the constituency of South Mayo.

Members of Parliament

Elections

Elections in the 1880s

Elections in the 1890s

Deasy resigns, causing a by-election.

Elections in the 1900s

Elections in the 1910s

References

Westminster constituencies in County Mayo (historic)
Dáil constituencies in the Republic of Ireland (historic)
Constituencies of the Parliament of the United Kingdom established in 1885
Constituencies of the Parliament of the United Kingdom disestablished in 1922